Nayuchi is a town located in Machinga District in Malawi. Serving as a border post for road and rail control between Malawi and Mozambique.

The Mozambican town of Entre-Lagos is conurbed with Nayuchi.

Transport
The town has a railway station on the Nacala railway, under concession of Central East African Railways. The town of Nayuchi has one of the most important railway stations on the Nacala railway, linking Nkaya and Liwonde (west) to Nampula and Port of Nacala (east).

Notable people 
 Esther Jolobala, politician

References

Populated places in Southern Region, Malawi